Phyllonorycter oxyacanthae is a moth of the family Gracillariidae. It is found in all of Europe except the Balkan Peninsula.

The wingspan is 6–8 mm. 
The  posterior tarsi with dark fuscous spots. Forewings are golden-brown to dark brown ; a white median streak from base to near middle, dark margined above ; dorsum narrowly white towards base ; four costal and three dorsal white wedge-shaped spots, anteriorly blackish-margined, first costal small, first dorsal long, sometimes interrupted ; a blackish apical spot. Hindwings are dark grey. The larva is pale yellowish ; dorsal line green ; head pale brown.

The moth flies in two generations in May and in August.

The larvae feed on Crataegus and Rosaceae species. Other recorded foodplants include Crataegomespilus arnieresi, Crataegus chrysocarpa, Crataegus monogyna, Crataegus oxyacantha, Crataegus pentagyna, Crataegus rivularis, Cydonia oblonga, Mespilus germanica, Pyracantha coccinea, Pyrus communis, Sorbus aucuparia and Sorbus torminalis.

References

External links
 UKmoths
 Leafminers
 

oxyacanthae
Leaf miners
Moths described in 1856
Moths of Europe
Taxa named by Heinrich Frey